Patrice Leconte (born 12 November 1947) is a French film director, actor, comic strip writer, and screenwriter.

Life and career
Leconte grew up in Tours, and began making little amateur films at 15. He went to Paris in 1967 and studied at  Institut des hautes études cinématographiques. While attending film school in the late 1960s, Leconte also worked as a cartoonist, in particular for the  Franco-Belgian comics magazine Pilote. He directed his first feature film in 1976, and had a number of major successes with comedy films that were barely distributed outside France. He first came to international attention in 1989 with Monsieur Hire, which was shown at the 1989 Cannes Film Festival and which was a radical departure from his previous work. Although he had already directed more than half a dozen features, many foreign critics, unfamiliar with his previous work, essentially treated him as a newcomer. Since then, he has alternated between films such as Ridicule and L'homme du train which have had success in the international arthouse market, and others, like Les Grands Ducs, whose appeal has been limited to France.

In the 2000s, Patrice Leconte received more recognition in the United States with the successful United States releases of Girl on the Bridge, The Widow of Saint-Pierre, Man on the Train and Intimate Strangers (Paramount Classics released three of these films in the United States).  Ryan Mottesheard of IndieWIRE wrote: "you could even argue that no other foreign filmmaker (INCLUDING Pedro Almodóvar) has had as strong of an impact on United States arthouses."

An English language remake of Leconte's film Man on the Train was remade by an independent Hollywood studio in 2011, and two others are in 'development': Intimate Strangers and My Best Friend.

Patrice Leconte's film, The Suicide Shop, was screened at the Newport Beach Film Festival in Newport Beach, California, on 28 April and 2 May 2013.

Director

Notes
 Lisa Downing, Patrice Leconte (Manchester: Manchester University Press, 2004)

References

External links

 
 Patrice Leconte at Allmovie
 Short bio
 Interview with Patrice Leconte on The Widow of St. Pierre

1947 births
Living people
French male screenwriters
20th-century French screenwriters
21st-century French screenwriters
Best Director César Award winners
Filmmakers who won the Best Foreign Language Film BAFTA Award
French male film actors
20th-century French male actors
21st-century French male actors
Film directors from Paris